Sonnenburg concentration camp was opened on 3 April 1933 in Sonnenburg (now Słońsk in Poland) near Küstrin (Kostrzyn nad Odrą) in a former Neumark prison, on the initiative of the Free State of Prussia Ministry of the Interior and Justice.

History 
Although the state of hygiene in the building, which had been closed in 1930 was appalling, officials of the Prussian justice ministry recommended it as a suitable site. They estimated the capacity of the building at 941 so-called  protective custody prisoners (Schutzhäftlinge), who could be accommodated either in single cells or in communal cells holding up to 20, 30 and 60 people each. The first 200 prisoners along with 60 SA auxiliary police came on 3 April 1933 from the Berlin Police Presidium. Later, on the order of the head of the Prussian Gestapo, prisoners were deported from the penal institution of Gollnow in Pomerania to Sonnenburg, bringing the number of inmates to 1,000.

Sonnenburg concentration camp was officially closed on 23 April 1934, although in practice it remained open. Since the beginning of the Second World War in 1939 the concentration camp or punishment camp (Straflager) continued as a concentration and labour camp for alleged anti-German people from the occupied territories until 1945. Amongst its inmates were the resistance fighters, Jean-Baptiste Lebas and Bjørn Egge. The French spy, René Lefebvre, father of Archbishop Marcel Lefebvre, succumbed in 1944 to the consequences of imprisonment there.

On the night of 30th-31st January 1945 with the Red Army approaching, the Gestapo killed over 800 prisoners by lining them up against a wall and shooting them. Soviet soldiers entered the camp on 2nd February to find the bodies still lying in the courtyard (see picture above right)

German staff 
The first commandant was police lieutenant (Polizeioberleutnant) Keßler. After him came:
 Police second lieutenant (Polizeileutnant) Bark
 Police lieutenant Siegmund
 SA-Sturmführer Jahr

SA-Sturmführer Bahr initially commanded the infamous Berlin SA storm troops (Stürme) No. 1 Horst Wessel and No. 33 Mordsturm Maikowski, which were responsible for guarding prisoners. They were reinforced by members of the police. In late April, the Berlin SA men were replaced by others from Frankfurt/Oder. At the end of August the SS took over, as they did in many camps, with 150 men from the 27th SS Regiment (SS-Standarte 27) from Frankfurt/Oder.

Notable prisoners 
During the early years of their rule, and long before the start of the war, the Nazi regime mainly imprisoned Communists and Social Democrats in Sonnenburg. These included:

 Gerhard Kratzat, German resistance fighter
 Jean-Baptiste Lebas, French minister and deputy to the National Assembly, World War I and II resistance activist
 Hans Litten, German lawyer
 Erich Mühsam, German-Jewish antimilitarist anarchist writer
 Carl von Ossietzky, German pacifist
 René Lefebvre, French resistance fighter and monarchist
 Eugène Greau, French professional cyclist

Other early concentration camps 
 Breitenau concentration camp (1933–1934)
 Breslau-Dürrgoy concentration camp in Wrocław, Poland
 Esterwegen concentration camp
 Kemna concentration camp
 Oranienburg concentration camp
 Vulkanwerft concentration camp in the Bredow district of Stettin

See also 

 Glossary of Nazi Germany
 The Holocaust
 List of books about Nazi Germany
 List of concentration and internment camps
 List of Nazi-German concentration camps
 Nazi concentration camps
 Nazi Party
 Nazi songs
 World War II

Notes

Citations

References 
 Klaus Drobisch, Günther Wieland: System der NS- Konzentrationslager. 1933–1939. Akademie Verlag, Berlin, 1993, .
 Kaspar Nürnberg: Außenstelle des Berliner Polizeipräsidiums: Das „staatliche Konzentrationslager“ Sonnenburg bei Küstrin. In: Wolfgang Benz, Barbara Distel (ed.): Herrschaft und Gewalt. Frühe Konzentrationslager 1933–1939. Metropol Verlag, Berlin 2002, S. 83–100 (Geschichte der Konzentrationslager 1933–1945, vol. 2).
 Christina Morina: Die "Folterhölle Sonnenburg". Gedenkstätte ehemaliges Konzentrationslager Sonnenburg/Słonsk 1933–1945. published by the Rotary Club of Frankfurt (Oder) and the town of Słonsk. Frankfurt (Oder) 2004.
 Kaspar Nürnberg: Sonnenburg. In: Wolfgang Benz, Barbara Distel (ed.): Der Ort des Terrors. Geschichte der nationalsozialistischen Konzentrationslager. Vol. 2: Frühe Lager, Dachau, Emslandlager. C. H. Beck, Munich, 2005, S. 200–207.

External links 

 Sonnenburg concentration camp museum 

 
Buildings and structures in Lubusz Voivodeship
1930s in Prussia
Nazi concentration camps in Poland